Appias olferna, the eastern striped albatross or Bengal albatross, is a butterfly in the genus Appias of the family Pieridae. The species was first described by Charles Swinhoe in 1890.

Distribution
Appias olferna is native to southern Asia and south-western Oceania.

The species is found from Bengal to Assam in India; in Myanmar, Laos, and Vietnam in Indochina; and on Christmas Island off Australia.

References 

olferna libythea
Butterflies of Asia
Butterflies of Oceania
Butterflies of Indochina
Butterflies of Australia
Butterflies of Indonesia
Butterflies of Malaysia
Butterflies of Singapore
Fauna of Christmas Island
Butterflies described in 1890